Ryan Montgomery is an American country music artist. He was born and raised in South Florida. He has performed with Dustin Lynch, Craig Campbell, and Chase Bryant.

Career
Montgomery released his debut single, "Drop a Tailgate", on June 3, 2018, and self-titled 6-song debut EP on June 29, 2018. Montgomery's 2018–19 releases landed on Apple Music's Best of the Week (All Charts), Cool Country Playlist, Hot Tracks, Spotify's Release Radar, Discover Weekly, Daily Mix and New Country 2018. Ryan released 'Til The Sun Came Up on September 6, 2019. He is currently enrolled in the BBA program at Florida Atlantic University while pursuing his music career in the country genre.

Personal life
Montgomery participates in sports such as ice hockey, basketball, waterskiing, surfing and working out.

Discography

Extended plays

Singles

References

External links

1999 births
Living people
21st-century American singers
21st-century American male singers
American country singer-songwriters
American male singer-songwriters